Ormrod is a surname. Notable people with the surname include:

Alan Ormrod (born 1942), English cricketer
Anne Ormrod (born 1987), New Zealand association football player
Mark Ormrod (athlete) (born 1982), Australian athlete
Mark Ormrod (historian), English historian
Roger Ormrod (1911-1992), English judge
William L. Ormrod (1863–1921), New York state senator

See also
Ormerod